Pentaplaris is a genus of South American flowering plants in the family Malvaceae.

It contains the following species:
 Pentaplaris davidsmithii
 Pentaplaris doroteae
 Pentaplaris huaoranica

Bombacoideae
Malvaceae genera
Taxonomy articles created by Polbot